Music from Van-Pires is the only studio album recorded by the John Entwistle Band and is Entwistle's final solo album before his death in 2002. It was a soundtrack for the Sci-Fi Award-winning UPN animated children's computer-generated television series Van Pires, which only aired between 1997 and 1998, shooting 13 episodes, which Entwistle had been involved with. The album was not officially released as a collection. Some of the tracks appear on his solo compilation album So Who's the Bass Player? The Ox Anthology, despite this. Notably, this album was not re-released alongside Entwistle's other solo studio albums in 2005.

The song "Bogey Man" was originally written for The Who's 1978 album Who Are You by John Entwistle, but was rejected by the band for being too humorous. A demo was recorded by Entwistle and Keith Moon. The demo went largely forgotten and was believed to have been lost until the 1990s. Entwistle resorted to his old demos for material for the soundtrack to the 1997 children's television programme Van Pires, to help him meet a contract which agreed he would write and record 13 new songs and a theme tune in 3 months. When the band's drummer, Steve Luongo heard the demo, he recognized Keith Moon's drumming on the demo, and the band decided to record a new version of the song with Moon's original drum track.

Track listing

Personnel
The John Entwistle Band
 John Entwistle - vocals, bass guitar, brass, orchestration, mixing
 Steve Luongo - percussion, drums, vocals, orchestration, mixing
 Alan St. Jon - keyboards, synthesizer, organ, backing vocals, orchestration
 Godfrey Townsend - guitar, backing vocals
with:
 Leslie West - lead guitar and lead vocals on "Don't Be a Sucker"
 Keith Moon - drums on "Bogey Man"
Mark and Jade Varley - speech on "Good and Evil"
Technical
 Bobby Pridden - engineer

References 

John Entwistle albums
2000 soundtrack albums
Television soundtracks